Shahin Imranov (born 23 September 1980) is a boxer from Azerbaijan. He is
best known for winning two featherweight silver medals at European championships.

Career
Imranov won a silver medal at the 2002 European Amateur Boxing Championships. He qualified for the 2004 Summer Olympics by ending up in second place at the 2nd AIBA European 2004 Olympic Qualifying Tournament in Warsaw, Poland. In the 2004 Olympics boxing tournament he was defeated in the second round of the featherweight (57 kg) division by the eventual gold medal winner, Russian Alexei Tichtchenko.

He repeated his 2002 championship success at the 2006 European Amateur Boxing Championships. At the world championships of 2007 he was upset by Indian Anthresh Lalit Lakra. At the 2008 Olympics he retired with an elbow injury in his semifinal against Khedafi Djelkhir and won Bronze, he was trailing 2–5.

References
Yahoo! Sports
sports-reference

1980 births
Living people
Azerbaijani male boxers
Featherweight boxers
Boxers at the 2004 Summer Olympics
Boxers at the 2008 Summer Olympics
Olympic boxers of Azerbaijan
Olympic bronze medalists for Azerbaijan
Olympic medalists in boxing
Medalists at the 2008 Summer Olympics
People from Sumgait
21st-century Azerbaijani people
20th-century Azerbaijani people